Jose L. Santiago is an American politician who served in the Massachusetts House of Representatives for the 16th Essex District from 1999 to 2003. He was defeated for reelection by Independent candidate and mayor of Lawrence, William Lantigua in 2002. He attempted to seek re-nomination for his old seat in 2004 but lost. He ran as an Independent for the 6th Essex District in 2012, but lost to incumbent Marcos Devers.

References

21st-century American politicians
American politicians of Dominican Republic descent
Hispanic and Latino American state legislators in Massachusetts
Democratic Party members of the Massachusetts House of Representatives
Living people
Year of birth missing (living people)
Politicians from Lawrence, Massachusetts